The Western Line School District (WLSD) is a public school district based in the community of Avon, Mississippi (USA).

In addition to Avon, the district serves the town of Metcalfe, a small portion of Greenville, as well as the unincorporated communities of Glen Allan and Winterville in Washington County. A small portion of northwestern Issaquena County lies within the district, including a section of Grace. It also serves Wayside.

The district was established in 1957.

Schools 
 O'Bannon High School
 Riverside High School
 O'Bannon Elementary School
 Riverside Elementary School
 Its Kindergarten classes are in the Morris Center Campus

Former schools:
 Skidsboro Junior High School

Demographics

2007-08 school year 
There were a total of 1,973 students enrolled in the Western Line School District during the 2007–2008 school year. The makeup of the district was 46% female and 54% male. The racial makeup of the district was 53.22% African American, 44.45% White, 1.82% Hispanic, and 0.51% Asian.

Previous school years

Accountability statistics

See also 
 Givhan v. Western Line Consolidated School District
 List of school districts in Mississippi

References

External links 
 

Greenville, Mississippi
Education in Washington County, Mississippi
Education in Issaquena County, Mississippi
School districts in Mississippi
1957 establishments in Mississippi
School districts established in 1957